Juan José Oroz Ugalde (born 11 July 1980 in Pamplona, Navarre) is a Spanish former professional road bicycle racer, who rode professionally between 2006 and 2014 for the Kaiku, Orbea, PinoRoad, and  teams. He now works as the general manager of UCI ProTeam .

Between October 2007 and April 2008, Oroz was the only professional cyclist to complete all Five Monuments of Cycling, including Giro di Lombardia, Milan–San Remo, Tour of Flanders, Paris–Roubaix and Liège–Bastogne–Liège.

Major results

2009
6th Overall Vuelta a Andalucía
7th Overall Critérium International
2010
8th GP Miguel Indurain
2014
6th Overall Tour de Korea
1st Stage 3

References

External links 

Profile at Euskaltel-Euskadi official website 

Interview in cyclingnews.com

Spanish male cyclists
1980 births
Living people
Sportspeople from Pamplona
Cyclists from Navarre
Directeur sportifs